Chorman Airport  is a public use airport located two nautical miles (4 km) southwest of the central business district of Farmington, a town in Kent County, Delaware, United States. It is privately owned by Allen Chorman.

Facilities and aircraft 
Chorman Airport covers an area of 134 acres (54 ha) at an elevation of 66 feet (20 m) above mean sea level. It has one runway designated 16/34 with an asphalt surface measuring 3,588 by 37 feet (1,094 x 11 m).

For the 12-month period ending December 31, 2011, the airport had 14,600 general aviation aircraft operations, an average of 40 per day. At that time there were 19 aircraft based at this airport: 89.5% single-engine and 10.5% multi-engine.

See also 
 List of airports in Delaware

References

External links 
  at Delaware DOT airport directory
 Aerial image as of March 1992 from USGS The National Map
 

Airports in Kent County, Delaware